Concepción del Norte is a municipality in the Honduran department of Santa Bárbara.

Demographics
At the time of the 2013 Honduras census, Concepción del Norte municipality had a population of 8,989. Of these, 76.85% were Mestizo, 21.45% White, 0.34% Black or Afro-Honduran, 0.20% Indigenous and 1.16% others.

References

Municipalities of the Santa Bárbara Department, Honduras